Arjunan Pillayum Anchu Makkalum is a 1997 Indian Malayalam-language film, directed and produced by Chandrasekharan. The film stars Innocent, Jagadish, Jagathy Sreekumar, Harishree Ashokan, KPAC Lalitha, Kalpana, Charmila and Bindu Panicker in the lead roles. The film has musical score by Mohan Sithara.
It is a remake of the 1996 Tamil film Kaalam Maari Pochu.

Plot
Arjunan Pillai marries off his 3 of his 4 educated daughters - Jayalakshmi, Jayaprabha and Jayasree, to responsible, but low-earning simple human beings. This makes his 3 daughters and his wife Sarada angry. Later, his 3 daughters get reconciled with their respective spouses. The four sisters feel neglected since their father is more appreciative of their brother Ajayan. Sarada dies when she sees him foolishly transferring his property to his son for his son to get a loan. However, the old man's only son throws him out, but his daughters husbands on their own help their father in law in ensuring that the lost property goes back to their father in law so that the last daughter can be married off.

Cast

Innocent as Arjunan Pillai
Jagadish as Uthaman
Jagathy Sreekumar as Sudhakaran
Harishree Ashokan as Thankakuttan 
Baiju as Ajayan
Mala Aravindan as Parameswaran
Salu Kuttanadu as Adjustment Ayyappan
C. I. Paul as K. D. P. Menon
KPAC Lalitha as Sharada
Bindu Panicker as Jayalakshmi
Kalpana as Jayaprabha
Charmila as Jayasree
Amitha Sebastian as Jayasudha
Dharsana as Seetha 
Cherthala Lalitha as Madhavi
Ottapalam Pappan as Nellissery Viswanatha Menon

Soundtrack
The music was composed by Mohan Sithara and the lyrics were written by Bichu Thirumala and Kaithapram.

References

External links
 

1997 films
1990s Malayalam-language films
Indian comedy-drama films
1997 comedy-drama films
Malayalam remakes of Tamil films
Indian family films
Films shot in Palakkad
Films shot in Ottapalam
Films scored by Mohan Sithara